Isongole is an administrative ward in Rungwe District, Mbeya Region, Tanzania. In 2016 the Tanzania National Bureau of Statistics report there were 3,534 people in the ward, from 3,207 in 2012.

Neighborhoods 
The ward has 4 neighborhoods.
 Mpindo
 Bulyaga Juu
 Bulyaga Kati
 Igamba

References 

Wards of Mbeya Region
Rungwe District
Constituencies of Tanzania